Canal Street was a station on the Long Island Rail Road's Main Line and Montauk Branch at Canal Street (now 168th Street) in Jamaica, Queens, New York City, United States.

History
The station opened on June 24, 1890, when the local Atlantic Avenue rapid transit trains were extended from Woodhaven Junction through Jamaica to Rockaway Junction, their new terminal. The station was closed in 1899, soon after the "rapid transit" trains started running to the Brooklyn Bridge. Seventeen years later, Brooklyn–Manhattan Transit Corporation opened 168th Street Station on the Jamaica Elevated Line as a replacement, which existed until 1977. The vicinity of the station is now occupied by the 104th Field Artillery Armory building of the New York Army National Guard, which was built in 1933.

References

Former Long Island Rail Road stations in New York City
Railway stations in Queens, New York
Railway stations in the United States opened in 1890
Railway stations closed in 1899
1890 establishments in New York (state)
1899 disestablishments in New York (state)